Flower of Avalon is a 2005 album by American folk singer Tracy Grammer.  This was her first full solo album following the death of Dave Carter in 2002.  The recording offered Grammer's take on nine previously unrecorded songs written by Carter and one traditional tune.  The album was very well received in reviews and was the most played album in 2005 on the Folk Radio Airplay Chart.

Track listing 
 "Shadows of Evangeline" (Carter) – 3:57  
 "Gypsy Rose" (Carter) – 5:03  
 "Laughlin Boy"  (Jolliff, Traditional) – 4:26  
 "Hard to Make It (Carter) – 3:35  
 "Hey Ho" (Carter) – 3:49  
 "Mother, I Climbed" (Carter) – 5:46  
 "Preston Miller" (Carter) – 4:41  
 "Winter When He Goes" (Carter) – 5:01  
 "Phantom Doll" (Carter) – 4:07  
 "Any Way I Do" (Carter) – 4:40

References

External links 
 Music page at official Tracy Grammer web site (lyrics and sound samples)

2005 albums
Dave Carter and Tracy Grammer albums
Tracy Grammer albums